Frannie's Turn is an American sitcom television series that premiered on CBS on September 13, 1992, and ended on October 10, 1992. The series was the first show Chuck Lorre ever created, after his time as a writer for Roseanne.

Synopsis
Set on Staten Island, New York, Frannie Escobar (Miriam Margolyes) is a homemaker whose life is making her crazy. But with laughter, wisdom and plenty of heart, Frannie copes with the ups and downs of everyday life with her cantankerous Cuban husband Joseph (Tomas Milian), his eccentric mother, their dim-witted son, and their headstrong daughter. In a house where the sexes battle, the cultures clash and the generation gap is unbridged, life is lively, unpredictable and always entertaining.

Cast
 Miriam Margolyes as Frannie Escobar
 Tomas Milian as Joseph Escobar
 Phoebe Augustine as Olivia Escobar
 Stivi Paskoski as Eddie Escobar
 Alice Drummond as Rosa Escobar
 Taylor Negron as Armando
 LaTanya Richardson as Vivian

Episodes

References

External links
Frannie's Turn @ Carsey-Werner.net (en)
Carsey-Werner Frannie's Turn

CBS original programming
1990s American sitcoms
1992 American television series debuts
1992 American television series endings
English-language television shows
Television series by Carsey-Werner Productions
Television shows set in New York City